Ooni Lugbade was the 33rd Ooni of Ife, a paramount traditional ruler of Ile Ife, the ancestral home of the Yorubas. He succeeded Ooni Okiti and was succeeded by  
Ooni Aribiwoso.

References

Oonis of Ife
Yoruba history